Gallery of Suicide is the sixth studio album by American death metal band Cannibal Corpse. It was released on April 21, 1998 through Metal Blade Records. It is also the first Cannibal Corpse album to feature former Nevermore guitarist Pat O'Brien.

Track listing

Credits 
Writing, performance and production credits are adapted from the album liner notes.

Personnel 
Cannibal Corpse
 George "Corpsegrinder" Fisher – vocals
 Pat O'Brien – lead guitar
 Jack Owen – rhythm guitar
 Alex Webster – bass
 Paul Mazurkiewicz – drums

Production
 Jim Morris – production, engineering, mixing, mastering

Artwork and design
 Vincent Locke – cover art
 Brian J. Ames – design
 Al Messerschmidt – photography
 Alison Mohammed – photography

Studios 
 Morrisound Recordings, Tampa, FL, US – production, engineering, mixing
 Audio JJ – mastering

References

External links 
 
 Gallery of Suicide at Metal Blade Records

1998 albums
Cannibal Corpse albums
Metal Blade Records albums
Albums recorded at Morrisound Recording